The men's road race was one of the cycling events at the 2011 Summer Universiade in Shenzhen, China. It took place on 13 August 2011, featuring 73 men from 18 countries and was held over 156.8 km distance.

Results

References 
Start list
Results

Cycling at the 2011 Summer Universiade
2011 in road cycling